Syriac Patriarch of Antioch may refer to:

 The head of Syriac Orthodox Church
 For individual patriarchs, see: List of Syriac Orthodox Patriarchs of Antioch
 The head of Syriac Catholic Church
 For individual patriarchs, see: Syriac Catholic Patriarchs of Antioch

See also
 Patriarch of Antioch
 Patriarchate of Antioch (disambiguation)
 List of Greek Orthodox Patriarchs of Antioch
 Catholic Patriarch of Antioch (disambiguation)